Ignatius D'Cunha (1 February 1924 – 11 October 2007) was the Bishop of the Roman Catholic Diocese of Aurangabad, located in Aurangabad, India.  He was ordained priest in 1955 and elevated to Bishop of Aurangabad in 1989. D'Cunha died on 11 October 2007 in Vasai, India.

References

External links
Catholic Hierarchy.com: Bishop Ignatius D'Cunha†
Catholic Bishops' Conference of India: Bishop Emeritus of Aurangabad Ignatius D'Cunha Passes Away

1924 births
2007 deaths
20th-century Roman Catholic bishops in India